John Drummond Walker (4 January 1891 – 22 July 1952) was a British rowing coxswain who competed in the 1912 Summer Olympics.

Walker was born in Oxford, the son of Rev. Edward Newburn Walker, senior tutor of The Queen's College, Oxford and his wife Gertrude May Hamilton. He was educated at New College, Oxford.

Walker was the coxswain of the New College eight which won the silver medal for Great Britain rowing at the 1912 Summer Olympics.

In 1918 Walker was in the Naval Sea Transport Branch, Ministry of Shipping when he was awarded the MBE.

References

External links
profile

1891 births
1952 deaths
Alumni of New College, Oxford
British male rowers
Olympic rowers of Great Britain
Rowers at the 1912 Summer Olympics
Olympic silver medallists for Great Britain
Olympic medalists in rowing
Medalists at the 1912 Summer Olympics
Coxswains (rowing)